John Randolph Chambliss Jr. (January 23, 1833 – August 16, 1864) was a career military officer, serving in the United States Army and then, during the American Civil War, in the Confederate States Army. A brigadier general of cavalry, Chambliss was killed in action during the Second Battle of Deep Bottom.

Early life
Chambliss was born at Hicksford in Greensville County, Virginia. His father, John R. Chambliss Sr., was a lawyer and politician who later served in the Confederate States Congress. The younger Chambliss was appointed to the United States Military Academy, graduating 31st of 52 in the Class of 1853, distinguished by having 15 future Civil War generals in it, including fellow Confederates John S. Bowen, John Bell Hood, and Henry B. Davidson.

Antebellum military career
Chambliss was commissioned as a brevet second lieutenant in the mounted infantry, and taught at the cavalry school at Carlisle, Pennsylvania until the following spring, when he resigned. He then returned home to Hicksford, where his father was a wealthy planter, and was engaged in agriculture until the spring of 1861. Taking advantage of his military education, he served as aide-de-camp to Governor Henry A. Wise, with the initial rank of major, from 1856–61. Chambliss was colonel of a regiment of Virginia militia from 1858–61. He was the brigade inspector general for the Commonwealth for two years. His father was a delegate to the secession convention in 1861, and the younger Chambliss maintained a strong allegiance to Virginia.

Civil War
With the outbreak of the Civil War, Chambliss was commissioned colonel of the 13th Virginia Cavalry in July 1861, and until the fall of 1862 was under the orders of Maj. Gen. D. H. Hill, in the department south of the James River. During the Maryland Campaign, he was put in command of the forces on the Rappahannock River, between Warrenton and Fredericksburg, with the 13th Virginia, 2nd North Carolina Cavalry, and 61st Virginia Infantry. He received a commendation for his performance from General Robert E. Lee. In November he was assigned with his regiment to W. H. F. "Rooney" Lee's cavalry brigade.

In April 1863, when the cavalry corps of the Union Army of the Potomac attempted to cross the Rappahannock and cut Lee's communications with Richmond, Chambliss was particularly prominent in turning back this movement. At Beverly Ford with 50 men, he drove two Federal squadrons into the river, capturing a number of prisoners. He and his men were commended for bravery by both Generals R. E. Lee and J.E.B. Stuart.

Gettysburg Campaign
In the Battle of Brandy Station, after Rooney Lee was wounded and Col. Solomon Williams killed, Chambliss took command of the brigade, and served in that capacity during the fighting in Aldie and Middleburg.

Riding with Stuart into Pennsylvania, Chambliss attacked the 18th Pennsylvania Cavalry of Judson Kilpatrick's division at Hanover, driving the Union force through the town, capturing its ambulances and a number of prisoners. His brigade and Fitzhugh Lee's reached Gettysburg late on July 2. On July 3, he engaged in the fierce fighting at East Cavalry Field. Upon the withdrawal of the army to safety in Virginia, his brigade covered the movement of the Confederate trains.

During the subsequent Bristoe Campaign, still in command of the brigade, Chambliss reinforced Lunsford L. Lomax at Morton's Ford and defeated the enemy. Engaged again near Brandy Station, the same two brigades fought with gallantry and Chambliss again received Stuart's written commendation.

Death

Promoted to brigadier general, Chambliss continued in command of the brigade, through the cavalry fighting from the Rapidan River to the James, gaining fresh laurels in the defeat of the Federals at Stony Creek. Finally, in a cavalry battle on the Charles City Road, on the north side of the James River, Chambliss was killed while leading his men. His body was buried with honor by the Federals, and soon afterward, On Wednesday the 17th of August 1864, a detachment of confederate soldiers came across the union lines under a flag of truce to retrieve Chambliss's body.  Thereafter, he was exhumed and delivered to his friends. It was buried in the family graveyard in Emporia, Virginia.

Robert E. Lee wrote that "the loss sustained by the cavalry in the fall of General Chambliss will be felt throughout the army, in which, by his courage, energy and skill, he had won for himself an honorable name."

See also

List of American Civil War generals (Confederate)

Notes

References
 Bergeron, Arthur W. "John Randolph Chambliss Jr." In The Confederate General, vol. 1, edited by William C. Davis and Julie Hoffman. Harrisburg, PA: National Historical Society, 1991. .
 Bird, Kermit M. "Quill of The Wild Goose:Civil War Diaries and Letters of Joel Molyneux". Shippensburg, PA: White Mane Publishing Company, 1996. .
 Eicher, John H., and David J. Eicher, Civil War High Commands. Stanford: Stanford University Press, 2001. .
 Evans, Clement A., ed. Confederate Military History: A Library of Confederate States History. 12 vols. Atlanta: Confederate Publishing Company, 1899. .
 Patterson, Gerard A. Rebels from West Point. Mechanicsburg, PA: Stackpole Books, 2002. .
 Sifakis, Stewart. Who Was Who in the Civil War. New York: Facts On File, 1988. .
 Warner, Ezra J. Generals in Gray: Lives of the Confederate Commanders. Baton Rouge: Louisiana State University Press, 1959. .

1833 births
1864 deaths
People from Greensville County, Virginia
Confederate States Army brigadier generals
United States Military Academy alumni
People of Virginia in the American Civil War
Confederate States of America military personnel killed in the American Civil War